Timur Ibragimov (ru)
 Anatoly Ivanishin
 Aleksandr Ivanov (captain) (ru)
 Aleksandr Ivanov (senior lieutenant) (ru)
 Anatoly Ivanov (ru)
 Andrey Ivanov (ru)
 Valery Ivanov (ru)
 Zuriko Ivanov (ru)
 Igor Ivanov
 Pyotr Igashov (ru)
 Yuri Igitov (ru)
 Nikolai Ignatov (ru)
 Aleksandr Igoshin (ru)
 Roman Igoshin (ru)
 Abdulla Izhaev
 Oleg Ilyin (ru)
 Arzulum Ilyazov (ru)
 Georgy Ionin (ru)
 Gennady Ireykin (ru)
 Mutey Isaev (ru)
 Nikolai Isaev (ru)
 Oleg Isaev (ru)
 Gevork Isakhanyan (ru)
 Abdulkhakim Ismailov
 Muslim Ismailov (ru)
 Rafik Ikhsanov (ru)

References 
 

Heroes I